Isidore (or Julien) Bertheaume (ca. 1752 – 20 March 1802) was a French classical composer and violinist.

Biography 
Born in Paris, Bertheaume was a child prodigy. He was the nephew of violinist Jacques Lemière the eldest (who died in 1771). According to the Mercure de France of April 1761, at the age of nine and a half, he obtained great success at the Concert Spirituel with a sonata by Lemière and another by Felice Giardini. In 1767, he joined the Orchestra of the Paris Opera and became its first violin in 1774. Then in 1788, he was appointed concertmaster of the Opéra-Comique orchestra. Between 1788 and 1791, he conducted the orchestra of the Concert Spirituel. In 1791 Bertheaume left France and held several posts in northern Germany until 1801. Via Copenhagen and Stockholm he emigrated to Russia, where he became first violin in the tsar's court orchestra. He died a few months after arriving at St-Petersburg.

Among Bertheaume's numerous pupils were Jean-Jacques Grasset and his nephew Charles Philippe Lafont.

Works 
 Six sonates à violon seul et basse continue (1769)
  2 Sonatas for 2 Violins, Op.2
  6 Violin Duos, Op.3
 Deux concertos pour le violon Op. 5 (1786)
 Deux symphonies concertantes pour deux violons et alto Op. 6 (1787)
 Trois sonates pour le clavecin ou Piano-forte avec accompagnement de violon Op. 7 (1787)

Bibliography 
 
 François-Joseph Fétis, Biographie universelle des musiciens et bibliographie générale de la musique (1863)

External links 
 

French classical composers
French male classical composers
18th-century French male classical violinists
Musicians from Paris
1750s births
1802 deaths